Upamāṇa (Sanskrit: "comparison"), upamana in Hinduism, is a pramāṇa, or means of having knowledge of something.  Observance of similarities provides knowledge of the relationship between the two. It also means getting the knowledge of an unknown thing by comparing it with a known thing. For example, assume a situation where a man has 
not seen a gavaya or a wild cow and doesn't know what it is. A forester told him that a wild cow 
is an animal like a country cow but she is more furious and has big horn in her forehead. In a 
later period he comes across a wild cow in a forest and recognizes it as the wild cow by 
comparing the descriptions made by the forester. This knowledge is possible due to the upamana 
or comparison. Thus, upamana is the knowledge of the relation between a name and the object it 
denotes by that name.

Hindu philosophical concepts
Concepts in epistemology